Sardar Kaure Khan Jatoi or Sardar Kauray Khan Jatoi. (Urdu سردار کوڑے خان جتوئی ) was a landlord in Muzaffargarh, Punjab, Pakistan born in 1800. His father's name was Sardar Saad Khan Jatoi. He donated 82553 Kanals and 14 Marla of land for public welfare purposes in British India, now known as the Pakistan area of Muzaffargarh and Rajanpur districts. He died in 1898.

Land donation and will details
During his life, he executed a will on 5 August 1894 through which he transferred and distributed his property to his children, in case, any of his wives would bear children and to his wives according to the principles of Muslim inheritance law. The will also state that if any of his wives would not bear a child, his property would be transferred and distributed as under:

Each of his wives shall get 1/9th share of his property; and
The remaining 3/9th share of his property shall be transferred to the Local Fund. As per his Will he executed that Bitoray Lillah Brai Kharch Rifa-e-aam (Public Welfare)

As per the contents of the Will, the 3/9th share of his property was transferred in 1898 to the Local Fund, which is, now, being run as Zila Council, Muzaffargarh. At present, the property is situated in two Districts of Punjab that are Muzaffargarh and Rajanpur

Property detail
The detail of Property transferred to the Local Fund is as under: Total 82553 Kanals and 14 Marla.
Land consisting of 20 Muazaat (Villages) measuring 71777 Kanals and 02 Marla is situated in Tehsil Jatoi, District Muzaffargarh,
Land measuring 172 Kanals and 01 Marla is situated in Tehsil Alipur, District Muzaffargarh.
Land measuring 10067 Kanals and 18 Marlas is situated in Tehsil Jampur, Rajanpur District
Land measuring 536 Kanals and 13 Marlas is situated in Tehsil and Rajanpur District

As per Jamabandi and Jadeed Lot Bandi, total land transferred to the Local Fund (Zila Council), Muzaffargarh by Sardar Kaura Khan Jatoi is 82753 Kanals and 14 Marlas. The land has further been divided into 415 Lots, out of these 415 Lots, 405 are in Tehsil Jatoi, 3 are in Tehsil Alipur, 5 are in Tehsil Jampur and 4 are in Tehsil & District Rajanpur.

Sardar Kaure Khan Lands Trust
The land, at present, is being managed by Management Committee constituted under rule 3(1) of the Sardar Kaure Khan (Management, Supervision and Protection of Land) Rules 2016. The committee is headed by the Commissioner Dera Ghazi Khan Division, comprising the District Coordination Officers and the District Police Officers of both Districts that are Muzaffargarh and Rajanpur, a representative from Local Government & Community Development Department, District Bar Association, Muzaffargarh, Progressive Grower from Tehsil Jatoi (a coopted member), a representative from Akhuwat Foundation (Non-Governmental Organization).
The Lots are leased out for the period not more than four years. The income/profit from the bequeathed Land and deposited in Bank of Punjab, Muzaffargarh from the bequeathed Land.

Acknowledgment
Sardar Kauray Khan Higher Secondary School Muzaffargarh
Sardar Kauray Khan park Jatoi
Sardar Kauray Khan library in Jatoi
Sardar Kouray khan Road in Muzaffargarh city

References

Muzaffargarh
1898 deaths
Pakistani social workers
Pakistani philanthropists
Pakistani humanitarians
Pakistani pacifists
1800 births
19th-century philanthropists
People from Muzaffargarh